Chamaepsichia is a genus of moths belonging to the family Tortricidae.

Species
Chamaepsichia cetonia Razowski, 2011
Chamaepsichia chitonregis Razowski, 2011
Chamaepsichia durranti (Walsingham, 1914)
Chamaepsichia rubrochroa Razowski, 2009

See also
List of Tortricidae genera

References

  2009: Revision of Mictopsichia Hübner with descriptions of new species and two new genera (Lepidoptera: Tortricidae). Polish Journal of Entomology 78 (3): 223-252. Full article: 
  2011: Descriptions of five new species of the Neotropical Mictopsichia group of genera (Lepidoptera: Tortricidae). Zootaxa, 3058: 63–68. Preview

External links
tortricidae.com

 
Heteroneura genera